The 1985 Czechoslovak presidential election took place on 22 May 1985. Gustáv Husák was re-elected for his third term and remained in the office until 1989 when he resigned as a result of the Velvet Revolution. Husák was the only candidate.

References

Presidential
Gustáv Husák
1985
Single-candidate elections
Elections in Communist Czechoslovakia